The United People's Alliance (APU) was a political alliance in Guinea-Bissau. It consisted of the Guinean People's Party (PPG) and the Socialist Alliance of Guinea (ASG).

History
The Alliance was formed in early 2004 in order to contest the March 2004 parliamentary elections. It received 1.36% of the vote and won a single seat, taken by Fernando Gomes of the ASG.

The Alliance was dissolved by the end of 2004, and Gomes joined the African Party for the Independence of Guinea and Cape Verde.

References

Political party alliances in Guinea-Bissau
Political parties established in 2004
Political parties disestablished in 2004
2004 establishments in Guinea-Bissau
2004 disestablishments in Guinea-Bissau
Defunct political parties in Guinea-Bissau